Monorchism (also monorchidism) is the state of having only one testicle within the scrotum.

Terminology
An individual having monorchism can be referred to as monorchid.

Causes

This can be due to:
 One testicle not descending into the scrotum during normal embryonic or fetal development (3–4% of 'normal' live births), also known as undescended testis or cryptorchidism. In this case the testis is within the abdominal cavity, somewhere along the normal route of descent – most commonly, within the inguinal canal. Such a testis has an increased risk of malignancy.
 One testicle may disappear during development (the so-called vanishing testis) due to some intrauterine insult. This is thought to be most likely vascular, such as testicular torsion.
 One testicle may have been surgically removed through orchiectomy.
 One testicle may be injured.

Notable cases

Due to testicular cancer
Lance Armstrong, American bicyclist.
Frank Church, former U.S. Senator and Presidential candidate.
Tom Green, Canadian comedian-actor.
Richard Herring, English comedian and writer
John Kruk, former baseball player
Mark Latham, former Australian politician.
Geoff Horsfield, English footballer.
Nenê, Brazilian basketball player.
Kevin Curtis, American football player.
Nigel Farage, former leader of the UK Independence Party.
Bobby Moore, English footballer and World Cup winner.
 Jimmy White, English snooker player.

Due to injury
 Archibald Douglas, 4th Earl of Douglas, magnate of the Kingdom of Scotland, and Peer of France. Lost in 1403, while fighting at the Battle of Shrewsbury (The previous year he had lost an eye at the Battle of Homildon Hill).
 Troy Bayliss, world superbike champion in 2001, 2006 and 2008. In 2007 he lost a testicle during a race at Donington Park.
 Brian Foster, American mixed martial artist.
 John Starks, American basketball player.
 Paul Wood, English rugby league player who sustained a ruptured testicle during a match and subsequently had it removed.
 Thurgood Marshall, United States Supreme Court Justice who injured a testicle during a fraternity event in university.
 Porvali Robert, Grandson of Seppo Porvali and nephew of Finnish author Mikko Porvali, injured his testicle whilst downhill skiing in Ylläs.

Due to cryptorchidism
 Mao Zedong, founder of the People's Republic of China.

Unknown
 Possible monorchism of Adolf Hitler
 Francisco Franco, Dictator of Spain.

Monorchism in nonhuman animals
Although extremely rare, monorchism has been observed to be characteristic of some animal species, notably in beetles.

See also
 Anorchia
 Cryptorchidism
 Polyorchidism

References